George Ramirez (born July 31, 1994), better known by his stage name Kap G, is a Mexican-American rapper. He is best known for his song "Girlfriend", which peaked at number 10 on the Bubbling Under Hot 100 chart.

Early life 
George Ramirez was born on July 31, 1994, in Long Beach, California, the youngest of seven children. He graduated from Tri-Cities High School.

Career 
Kap G has collaborated with big-name artists, such as Chief Keef, T.I., Wiz Khalifa, Jeezy and Kirko Bangz among others. He released his debut single, titled "Tatted Like Amigos"; a collaboration with Chicago rapper Chief Keef, which garnered him mainstream attention. Since then, Kap G began remixing other artists' songs, which drew the attention of Dungeon Family A&R Representative Kawan Prather, who ultimately discovered Kap G, which landed him a signing deal with Atlantic Records.

On March 6, 2014, Kap G released his mixtape, titled Like a Mexican via DatPiff. He is currently in the studio recording his first extended play (EP), with the assistance of Pharrell Williams. Kap G has been featured in numerous articles for XXL magazine, and was nominated for XXL Freshman in 2015. On March 4, 2016, Kap G released his song "Girlfriend", the second single from highly anticipated mixtape titled El Southside which features special guest appearances from Young Thug, Cash Out and YFN Lucci. "Girlfriend" became his biggest song to date, and was certified Gold by the RIAA in August 2016. On April 14, 2017, he released his debut studio album SupaJefe, on which he collaborates with Chris Brown, Dae Dae and Pharrell Williams. He was on the SupaJefe tour from July 6 to August 26, 2017. On June 12, 2017, XXL revealed Ramirez was included in their annual freshman class.

Musical style 
Much of his lyrical content pays homage and represents his Mexican culture and is bilingual, switching between English and Spanish. Kap G has said that his goal in his career is to subvert stereotypes of Mexicans and "to be a part of opening doors for Latinos". In an XXL interview he also stated that his style has been compared to Outkast and South Park Mexican.

Discography

Studio albums 
SupaJefe (2017)
No Kap (2018)

Mixtapes 
Like a Mexican (2014)
Real Migo Shit 2 (2014)
Real Migo Shit 3 (2015)
El Southside (2016)
Real Migo Shit 4 (2018)

EPs 
Mood (2017)
Kap On Edge (2022)

Singles

Other charted songs

Filmography

References 

Living people
American male rappers
Atlantic Records artists
Hispanic and Latino American male actors
Hispanic and Latino American rappers
1994 births
21st-century American rappers
21st-century American male musicians
People from Long Beach, California
People from College Park, Georgia
American rappers of Mexican descent
American male actors of Mexican descent
Rappers from California
Songwriters from Georgia (U.S. state)
Rappers from Atlanta